Deafness-vitiligo-achalasia syndrome is an extremely rare genetic disorder characterized by congenital hearing loss, vitiligo, low height, muscle degeneration and achalasia. It was first discovered in 1971, when Rozycki et al., when they described two siblings of the opposite sex with the symptoms mentioned above. It is thought to be inherited in an autosomal recessive manner.

References 

Genetic diseases and disorders
Hearing loss
Deafness